Pedals is the second album by Austin-based synth pop band Speak. The album was released on June 23, 2014 on Wind-up Records. Unlike the previous album, this was self-produced by member Troupe Gammage.

Track listing

References

External links
Pedals on iTunes

2014 albums
Speak (band) albums
Wind-up Records albums